Viva l'Italia is a 2012 Italian comedy film written and directed by Massimiliano Bruno.
Politician, Michele Spagnolo loses the ability to lie because of a stroke in the brain and that has dire consequences.

Cast 
 Raoul Bova as Riccardo Spagnolo
 Ambra Angiolini as  Susanna Spagnolo
 Michele Placido  as  Michele Spagnolo
 Alessandro Gassmann as Valerio Spagnolo
 Rocco Papaleo as Tony
 Edoardo Leo as  Marco
 Maurizio Mattioli as  Antonio
 Rolando Ravello as  Giansanti
 Sarah Felberbaum as  Valentina 
 Isabelle Adriani as  paziente ospedale
  Imma Piro as  Giovanna
  Camilla Filippi as  Elena
 Nicola Pistoia as Roberto D'Onofrio
 Isa Barzizza as  Marisa
 Sergio Fiorentini as  Cesare
 Remo Remotti as  Annibale
 Massimiliano Vado as  Max
  Samantha Fantauzzi as  Sonia 
  Edoardo Maria Falcone as Stalker
 Barbara Folchitto as  Anna
  Massimiliano Bruno as TV presenter
 Patrizia Pellegrino as Talk Show presenter
 Frankie HI-NRG MC as  Mc 
 Ninni Bruschetta as himself
 Paola Minaccioni as  Logopedist  
 Edoardo Pesce as Mazzone
 Stefano Fresi as  Santini
  Valerio Aprea as Director
  Lucia Ocone as Waitress
 Cristiano Malgioglio as himself
  Alessandro Mannarino as himself

External links 

2012 comedy films
2012 films
Films directed by Massimiliano Bruno
Italian comedy films
Films about dysfunctional families
Films set in Rome
2010s Italian films